Movial is a privately held software engineering company focused on Internet enabled devices in consumer electronics and telecommunications industries. The company’s services include device concept and user interface (UI) design, third-party application, service and platform integration, consulting, training, product maintenance and support. Device manufacturers and operators can use Movial’s creative and custom systems integration services, to assist them with increase ROI, and to streamline and speed product development utilizing open Linux platforms and ready-to-use applications. 

The company was founded in Helsinki, Finland in 2001 by Lauri Vilamo, Jari Ala-Ruona and Jon Molander. The company is known for having created Scratchbox, a cross-compilation toolkit intended to make embedded Linux application development easier. The company is also known for contributing their Browser D-Bus Bridge code, which allows developers to build widgets that can incorporate phone capabilities such as instant messaging and audio to the Open Source Community. In 2008, the company was recognized by the Linux Foundation for being one of the key contributors to the Linux kernel.

The company is also a member of the GSMA's RCS and VoLTE (Voice over LTE) initiative.

Company
The company's products include an SIP/IMS (RCS and MMTel) application for device manufacturers and service providers, and a white label toolkit and web runtime environment for Linux devices. Movial's products can be used in PCs, mobile phones, netbooks, laptops,in-car entertainment systems, and more.

Movial customers and partners include Adobe, ARM and BMW. The company claims it has the most commercial deployments of PC IMS clients in the world

History
Movial participated in creating the first mobile Linux device in the world. The company was formed in 2001 in Helsinki, Finland, and in 2003 became the first company in the world to cross-compile GTK for an embedded device with touch screen.

In 2004 Movial launched Push-to-video Phone, IM, and Video Camera in on Nokia's first S60 phone, followed by Communicator client products for PC and Consumer Electronics the following year. Movial joined LiPS Forum in 2006 and helped launch the COnverged MEssaging Technology (COMET) consortium. It also provided an IMS Client to Trolltech's Greenphone for 3GSM World Congress 2006.

In 2007 Movial was selected by ARM to create a free and open-source platform for next-gen mobile applications. Movial joined GSMA’s RCS program, LiMo and Khronos Group in 2008, the same year that Movial IXS Application Suite launched on Texas Instruments OMAP3 Platform.

Movial launched Social Communicator at Demo '08, shortly before Optimus in Portugal "PC-Enables" all mobile phone subscriptions with Movial Communicator. In 2009 Movial announced support for Qualcomm's Snapdragon chipset and that it would integrate, test, and certify Adobe Flash technology in embedded mobile environments that utilize ARM-based Linux under the Open Screen Project. The following year it launched a new cross platform Movial IXS Browser running on QtWebKit, which enabled developers to deploy and port touchscreen optimized User Interface code across any device. 

In 2009, Movial expanded to Romania, United States and Taiwan. In July 2020, it was reported that Microsoft had acquired 60 employees from Movial's Romanian division and took ownership of its offices there. The employees will work on Android-based products for Microsoft Devices.

Awards
The company received the FierceMobileContent "Top Mobile Application" Award in 2008 and was named an Infovision Award finalist the same year. In 2010 Movial won the "Best RCS Client" award for its Movial Communicator PC 8 Client in the GSMA Rich Communication Suite DevChallenge competition.

Partners
Adobe Systems
Alcatel-Lucent
ARM Holdings
Colibria
Ericsson
Global IP Sound
Qt (framework)
Qualcomm
Texas Instruments

References

External links
LG Nortel, Movial Introduce New Browsing Solution
GSMA Leads Mobile Industry Towards a Single, Global Solution for Voice over LTE
Collaboration optimizes Flash Player for Freescale i.MX
Why You should Care About Linux
RCS help operators battle mobile app explosion?
RCS Phase 2 - some progress
Movial brings HD to the PC
Far EasTone launches VoIP over HSPA
Operator VoIPo3G in Taiwan

Software companies of Finland